Erehima Zerga Biza (born 11 September 1987) is an Ethiopian footballer who plays for C.B.E and the Ethiopia national team.

She scored for Ethiopia in a 2012 African Women's Championship qualification match against Egypt.

She played for Ethiopia at the 2012 African Women's Championship.

References

1987 births
Living people
Ethiopian women's footballers
Ethiopia women's international footballers
Women's association football forwards